Les Cars is a commune in the Haute-Vienne department in the Nouvelle-Aquitaine region in western France.

See also 
 Communes of the Haute-Vienne department

References 

Communes of Haute-Vienne